Metzia lineata is a species of cyprinid fish. It inhabits medium-sized and small rivers of southern China, Taiwan, Laos, and Vietnam and is considered "least concern" by the IUCN Red List.

References

Cyprinidae
Cyprinid fish of Asia
Freshwater fish of China
Fish of Laos
Freshwater fish of Taiwan
Fish of Vietnam
Taxa named by Jacques Pellegrin
Fish described in 1907